Reading Football Club hold the record for the number of successive league wins at the start of a season, with a total of 13 wins at the start of the 1985–86 Third Division campaign and also the record for the number of points gained in a professional league season with 106 points in the 2005–06 Football League Championship campaign. Reading finished champions of their division on both of these occasions.

The club's largest win was a 10–0 victory over Gibraltar on 10 July 2019 in a pre-season friendly. Their biggest league win was a 10–2 victory over Crystal Palace on 4 September 1946 in the Third Division South. Reading's heaviest loss was an 18–0 defeat against Preston North End in the FA Cup 1st round on 27 January 1894.

The player with the most league appearances is Martin Hicks with a total of 500 from 1978 to 1991. The most capped player is Kevin Doyle, who earned 26 for Ireland while at the club. The most league goals in total and in a season is Ronnie Blackman with 158 from 1947 to 1954 and 39 in 1951–52 respectively. The player with the most league goals in a game is Arthur Bacon with six against Stoke City in 1930–31. The first Reading-based player to play in the World Cup is Bobby Convey at the 2006 World Cup with the United States. The record time for a goalkeeper not conceding a goal is Steve Death at 1,103 minutes in 1978–79, which is a former English league record.

Reading's highest attendance at Elm Park was in 1927, when 33,042 spectators watched Reading beat Brentford 1–0. The highest attendance at the Madejski Stadium is 24,160 for the Premier League game with Tottenham Hotspur on 16 September 2012.

The highest transfer fee received for a Reading player is the £8 million received from Crystal Palace for Michael Olise in July 2021, beating the £7 million fee that 1899 Hoffenheim paid for Gylfi Sigurðsson in August 2010. The most expensive player Reading have ever bought is George Pușcaș, for an estimated £8,000,000 from Internazionale on 7 August 2019.

Honours

League competitions
 English 2nd tier
 Winners (2): 2006, 2012
 Runners Up (1): 1995
English 3rd tier
 Winners (3): 1926, 1986, 1994
 Runners Up (5): 1932, 1935, 1949, 1952, 2002
English 4th tier
 Winners (1): 1979
Highest league finish
Premier League 2007, 8th Place

Cup competitions
FA Cup
 Semi-final: 1927, 2015
 Quarter-final: 1901, 2010, 2011, 2016
EFL Cup
 Quarter-final: 1996, 1998
Full Members Cup
 Winners (1): 1988
London War Cup
 Winners (1): 1941
Football League Third Division South Cup
 Winners (1): 1938

Youth and reserve competitions
Premier League Cup
 Winners (1): 2014
 Runners Up (1): 2017
Berks & Bucks Senior Cup
 Winners (3): 1879, 1892, 1995
 Runners-Up (4): 1941, 1997, 1998, 2000

Managerial
LMA Manager of the Year
Steve Coppell 2005–06, 2006–07
LMA Championship Manager of the Year
Brian McDermott 2011–12

Player records
Appearances
Most appearances: Martin Hicks (603; 1978–1991)
Most league appearances: Martin Hicks (500; 1978–1991)

Goals
Most goals: Trevor Senior (191; 1983–1987, 1988–1992)
Most goals in a season: Trevor Senior (41; 1983–84)
Most league goals: Ronnie Blackman (158; 1947–1954)
Most league goals in a season: Ronnie Blackman (39; 1951–52)
Most league goals in a game: Arthur Bacon (6 vs. Stoke City; 1930–31)
Most penalties: Ray Reeves (21)

Goalkeeping
Longest time without conceding a goal: Steve Death (1,103 minutes; 1978–79; former English league record)

Transfers
Record transfer fee paid: Tiago Ilori (£3,750,000 from Liverpool; 18 January 2017)
Record transfer fee received: Michael Olise (£8,000,000 to Crystal Palace; July 2021)

Internationals
Most capped player (whilst at Reading): Kevin Doyle (Republic of Ireland)
First Reading-based player to play in World Cup: Bobby Convey (2006; United States)

Appearances
The following players have played more than 398 times for Reading, in all competitions.

Goalscorers
The following players have scored more than 85 times for Reading, in all competitions.

Team records
 Biggest win: 10–2 v Crystal Palace (4 September 1946, Football League Third Division South)
 Heaviest defeat: 18–0 v Preston North End (27 January 1894, FA Cup 1st round)
 Longest winning sequence at the start of a season: 13 victories in 1985–86.
 Most points in a single season in any English professional league: 106 points (2005–06)
Longest winless sequence at the start of a season (club record): 6 (2 draws and 4 defeats), (2018–19)
Heaviest home defeat: 7-0 vs Fulham, (11 January 2022)

References

Reading F.C.
Records and Statistics